Veronica Filomena Rodrigues (1953–2010) was a Kenyan born Indian biologist. Veronica completed a B.A with honors in microbiology from Trinity College Dublin. After being inspired by the work of Obaid Siddiqi and his co-workers, she moved to India to pursue her Ph.D. While doing her PhD, considering her exceptional work, she was offered a permanent faculty position at TIFR. She also served as a senior professor at the National Centre for Biological Sciences, Bangalore. In 2004 she received the Senior National Woman Bioscientist Award. She died in 2010 after suffering from breast cancer for five years.

Life

Early life 

Veronica was born in a Goan immigrant family living in Nairobi, Kenya in 1953. She completed her school education in Nairobi and then entered Makerere University in Kampala for higher education but due to turmoil in the region moved to Trinity College Dublin.

Education and career 
Veronica had to leave Makerere University in Uganda owing to turmoil in the country. She eventually ended up getting a scholarship to study at Trinity College Dublin. She obtained a B.A. with Honours in Microbiology in 1976. She moved to India to pursue her PhD from Tata Institute of Fundamental Research (TIFR), Mumbai in 1977 under the supervision of Dr Obaid Siddiqi. Veronica describes why she decided to come to TIFR for her PhD:

She completed her PhD in 1981 and then went on to obtain post-doctoral training from Max Planck Institute for Biological Cybernetics, Tuebingen, Germany. where she pioneered the study of coding of olfactory information in the brain.

After her post-doc, she came back and worked for the Tata Institute of Fundamental Research (TIFR)  and subsequently became a fellow of the Indian National Science Academy. She also assumed many leadership roles in her career — first at the Department of Biological Sciences (earlier the Molecular Biology Unit) at TIFR and later, she became the Chair of the Department of Biological Sciences in TIFR Mumbai.

Personal 
When Veronica moved to India for work, she was not an Indian citizen. She applied for Indian citizenship but only got it with much effort and difficulty twenty years after having moved to the country.

Causes 
She was passionate about gender equality in the world of sciences. In 1990, she wrote a letter to then Dean Dr R Vijayaraghavan against the usage of titles for women scientists including 'Smt', 'Kum', or 'Ms'. She emphasized that until usage of 'Shri' and 'Kum' for male scientists became a norm, usage of similar titles for women scientists was unnecessary and unacceptable.

References 

1953 births
Indian geneticists
Indian women biologists
Kenyan biologists
2010 deaths
Women geneticists
Scientists from Bangalore
20th-century Indian biologists
20th-century Indian women